Texas church shooting may refer to:

 Daingerfield church shooting, which occurred in 1980
 Sutherland Springs church shooting, which occurred in 2017
 West Freeway Church of Christ shooting, which occurred in 2019

See also 
 List of shootings in Texas